The 2019 Arab Club Champions Cup Final was the final match of the 2018–19 Arab Club Champions Cup, the 28th season of the Arab League's main club football tournament organised by UAFA, and the 1st season since it was renamed from the Arab Club Championship to the Arab Club Champions Cup.

The match was played by Étoile Sportive du Sahel of Tunisia and Al Hilal SFC of Saudi Arabia, and held at the Hazza bin Zayed Stadium in Al Ain, United Arab Emirates.

Étoile Sportive du Sahel defeated Al-Hilal SFC 2–1 in the final and won the title for the first time in their history, becoming the third Tunisian team to win the competition in the last five editions.

Teams

Venue 
The Hazza bin Zayed Stadium is a multi-purpose stadium, located in the City of Al Ain, Emirate of Abu Dhabi, United Arab Emirates. It is the home stadium of Al Ain FC of the UAE Pro-League. The stadium holds 22,717 spectators and opened in 2014. The stadium was named after the chairman of the club, Sheikh Hazza bin Zayed bin Sultan Al Nahyan.

The 45,000 m2 (480,000 sq ft) Hazza bin Zayed stadium is split over seven levels, and is one of the most modern sporting venues in the Middle East. It is one of the most sophisticated sports venues in the region.

Route to the final

Match

Details

References 

Arab Club Champions Cup Finals